The United People of Cambodia was a political party created by its former president, Sarath Oeurn, in August 2003. Oeurn lives in America and only visits Cambodia and his party once a year in July. At the moment it is not led by Oeurn but its acting party president Tit Thang.

Political ideology
Its political ideology on the right-wing promotes controlling illegal immigration in a responsible manner as their president says illegal immigrants not only create “instability” because they came to Cambodia illegally but also because they sometimes ”tend to do illegal things.” The party also has a left-wing ideology as part of its political position where the UPC would prevent “unequal distribution of wealth” and “land management”. This political party wishes that when it gets to have some control of the “government” UPC would fulfill “a tax on large land holdings in order to decrease the number of land disputes.”

The party president believes this will prevent rich people from trying “to take land and might even give up land because of the tax burden," in order to "free up uncultivated land." Therefore, that would mean society would be able to use that land to grow food for themselves. With its activities the UPC has been fielding candidates in 13 communes, primarily in the provinces called Svay Rieng and Prey Veng.

References

External links
United People of Cambodia website

2003 establishments in Cambodia
Defunct political parties in Cambodia
Political parties established in 2003
Political parties with year of disestablishment missing